Drăculea may refer to:

 Vlad Drăculea, a Romanian name for Vlad the Impaler
 Drăculea (river), a tributary of the Lechința in Mureș County, Romania
 Drăculea Bandului, a village in the commune Band, Mureș County, Romania